Apollo 23 is a book in the Doctor Who New Series Adventures. It was the first book in the series to feature the Eleventh Doctor and  Amy Pond as his companion.

Plot

The Doctor and Amy arrive at a shopping centre much to The Doctor's disappointment. When arriving they discover that an American astronaut has appeared out of thin air. They both decide to materialize to the Moon which they successfully do and find the secret Base Diana.  Investigating, they learn of a plot by the evil Talerians to take over the Earth by possessing human bodies.  The Doctor ends up trapped on Earth and working with secret government officials, manages to return to the Moon on Apollo 23, there having secretly been Apollos 18 through 22 before a link was established between Earth and the Moon that allowed instantaneous travel before sabotage caused it to break down, causing the spaceman to appear.

On the Moon, Amy is captured and possessed and lures the Doctor into a trap, but he manages to escape with the help of Major Carlisle who managed to secretly remain unpossessed due to a power failure caused by Amy attempting to stop sabotage. With Carlisle's help, the Doctor finds a back-up copy of Amy's personality and restores her to normal and later manages to do the same using the fire suppression system to everyone but the alien leader, Jackson, who had kept his back-up with him.  Restoring everyone's minds through their back-ups also erases the alien minds possessing them.  Jackson manages to summon an invasion force of actual Talerians and reveals that the real Jackson's experiments had allowed him (the alien possessing him) to transfer himself to Jackson in the first place and start the invasion.  The Talerians are revealed to be balloon-like aliens that are extremely fragile and are dying out.  They want human bodies to survive.  The Doctor restores the real Jackson by secretly giving him his back-up in his tea and he sacrifices himself to destroy the Talerians by shooting out a window, causing a depressurization that kills the Talerian invaders due to their fragility, and also kills him.

Characters
The Eleventh Doctor
Amy Pond
Professor Jackson
Major Carlisle
Captain Reeve
General Walinski
Candace Hecker
Agent Jennings
Nurse Phillips
Colonel Devenish
Liz Didbrook
Pat Ashton
Marty Garrett

Translations
A French version of the book has been released by Milady editions in 2012. It has been translated by Rosalie Guillaume. A German version has been released by Basti Lübbe in 2019, translated by Axel Franken.

Audiobook
An unabridged audiobook running 5 hours and 29 minutes and read by James Albrecht was released by Audio Go.

The audiobook running 5 hours and 18 minutes in French language, read by Arnauld Le Ridant, is available by Hardigan.

Reviews

References

External links 

2010 British novels
Eleventh Doctor novels
Novels set on the Moon
Space exploration novels